Hugo Dietsche (born 31 March 1963) is a Swiss former wrestler who competed in the 1984 Summer Olympics, in the 1988 Summer Olympics, and in the 1992 Summer Olympics.

References

1963 births
Living people
Olympic wrestlers of Switzerland
Wrestlers at the 1984 Summer Olympics
Wrestlers at the 1988 Summer Olympics
Wrestlers at the 1992 Summer Olympics
Swiss male sport wrestlers
Olympic bronze medalists for Switzerland
Olympic medalists in wrestling
Medalists at the 1984 Summer Olympics
20th-century Swiss people